Majda Mehmedović (born 25 May 1990) is a Montenegrin handball player for Kastamonu and a former player of the Montenegrin national team.

She won a silver medal at the 2012 Summer Olympics.

International honours

Club
EHF Champions League:
Winner: 2012, 2015
Bronze Medalist: 2017, 2018
EHF Cup Winners' Cup:
Winner: 2010

National team
European Championship:
Winner: 2012
Summer Olympics:
Silver Medalist: 2012

Individual awards
 ProSport All-Star Left Wing of the Romanian Liga Națională: 2017
 Handball-Planet.com All-Star Left Wing: 2018
 All-Star Left Wing of the European Championship: 2018
 All-Star Left Wing of the EHF Champions League: 2021

References

External links

 

1990 births
Living people
Bosniaks of Montenegro
Montenegrin female handball players
Handball players at the 2012 Summer Olympics
Handball players at the 2016 Summer Olympics
Handball players at the 2020 Summer Olympics
Olympic handball players of Montenegro
Olympic medalists in handball
Olympic silver medalists for Montenegro
Medalists at the 2012 Summer Olympics
People from Bar, Montenegro
Expatriate handball players
Montenegrin expatriate sportspeople in Romania
Mediterranean Games medalists in handball
Mediterranean Games bronze medalists for Montenegro
Competitors at the 2009 Mediterranean Games